Seri Bahlol, also Sahr-i Bahlol or Sahri Bahlol, is a city and archaeological site located near Takht-i-Bahi, in Mardan District, about 70 kilometer north-west of Peshawar, Khyber Pakhtunkhwa, Pakistan.

History

Seri Bahlol is a historical place and it has been included in the UNESCO World Heritage List since 1980. The ruins of Seri Bahlol are the remnants of a small ancient fortified town built during the Kushan period. The city was protected during the time of John Marshall.

It contains the remains of Buddha, which have not been properly excavated. Antiques such as statues, coins, utensils and jewellery are commonly found. The local people continue illegal excavation in their homes and land, damaging the historical monuments. Some of the local dealers of antiques misguide the local population and instigate them to involve in illegal excavation. It requires national and international attention in order to reserve the remnants at Seri Bahlol.

The word "Seri Bahlol" has been explained by various people in different ways. The local people, however, explains that this is a combination of two Hindi words "Sheri" means Sir and "Bahlol" the name of a prominent political and religious leader of the area. However, the name is not as old as the village Seri Bahlol. The village is located on a hillock protected by a well sophisticated stone wall which was constructed under the Kushans. The wall is damaged in several places, but it is still visible in many places. The village is surrounded by fertile land where local people practice agriculture. For the last few years, the rapid population growth has engulfed the agriculture land which is a risk for food security.

Gallery

See also

 Hindu and Buddhist architectural heritage of Pakistan
 List of UNESCO World Heritage Sites in Pakistan

References

History of Pakistan
World Heritage Sites in Pakistan
Buddhism in Pakistan
Populated places in Mardan District
Buddhist sites in Pakistan
Archaeological sites in Khyber Pakhtunkhwa